The Surveillance and Response Group is a Force Element Group (FEG) of the Royal Australian Air Force with its headquarters at RAAF Base Williamtown.  The current commander of SRG is Air Commodore Barbara Courtney.

The group was formed on 30 March 2004 by amalgamating the Maritime Patrol Group and the Surveillance and Control Group. At this time it had a strength of over 2,100 personnel, and comprised No. 41, No. 44 and No. 92 Wings. No. 42 Wing became part of the group when it was re-formed on 1 January 2006.

References

External links
 

RAAF groups
Military units and formations established in 2004